Remigiusz Borkała (born 28 February 1999) is a Polish professional footballer who plays as a midfielder for Pelikan Łowicz.

References

Polish footballers
1999 births
Living people
Association football defenders
Piast Gliwice players
GKS Jastrzębie players
Pelikan Łowicz players
Ekstraklasa players
I liga players
II liga players
Polish expatriate footballers
Polish expatriate sportspeople in the Czech Republic
Expatriate footballers in the Czech Republic